Plasmodium globularis is a parasite of the genus Plasmodium subgenus Novyella. As in all Plasmodium species, P. globularis has both vertebrate and insect hosts. The vertebrate hosts for this parasite are birds.

Taxonomy
The parasite was first described by Valkiūnas et al. in 2008.

Distribution
This parasite is found in Ghana and Cameroon.

Hosts
P. globularis infects the yellow-whiskered greenbul (Andropadus latirostris).

References

globularis
Species described in 2008
Parasites of birds